Pseudopostega euryntis is a moth of the family Opostegidae. It was described by Edward Meyrick in 1907. It is known from Mysore, India, as well as Sri Lanka.

Adults have been recorded in June.

References

Opostegidae
Moths described in 1907